Milton C. Jones (4 August 1894 – 27 May 1932) was an American racecar driver.

Biography
Jones was born in Plymouth, Pennsylvania. He participated in the 1925 Indianapolis 500. Jones was a motorcycle rider and toured the country in a motordrome act with his wife Molly "the Mile-a-Minute Girl"; Jones was known by the nickname "Dare Devil Jones". They had a son, Milton Jones Jr.

Jones was killed in a crash at Indianapolis, Indiana, during a practice run for the 1932 Indianapolis 500.

Jones lived in Cleveland at the time of his death. He was buried in Acacia Masonic Memorial Park in Mayfield Heights, Ohio.

Indianapolis 500 results

References

See also
List of fatalities at Indianapolis

1894 births
1932 deaths
American racing drivers
Racing drivers who died while racing
Indianapolis 500 drivers
Sports deaths in Indiana